The Best American Short Stories 1993, a volume in The Best American Short Stories series, was edited by Katrina Kenison and by guest editor Louise Erdrich.

Short stories included

References

External links
 Best American Short Stories

1993 anthologies
Fiction anthologies
Short Stories 1993
Houghton Mifflin books